Michael Nash or Mike Nash may refer to:

 Michael H. Nash (1946–2012), American labor historian and archivist
 Michael L. Nash, American entertainment industry executive
 Michael P. Nash, American film director, screenwriter and producer
 Mike Nash (born 1965), Irish hurler

See also
 Nash (surname)